Warren Johnston (born 23 December 1935) is a former racing cyclist from New Zealand.

He won the silver medal in the men's 10 mile scratch race at both the 1958 and 1962 British Empire and Commonwealth Games. He also competed in the men's sprint placing 4th at both Games.

His only Olympic appearance was at the 1956 Summer Olympic Games where he competed in the men's sprint and the tandem event.

References

1935 births
Living people
New Zealand male cyclists
Commonwealth Games silver medallists for New Zealand
Cyclists at the 1956 Summer Olympics
Cyclists at the 1958 British Empire and Commonwealth Games
Cyclists at the 1962 British Empire and Commonwealth Games
Olympic cyclists of New Zealand
People from Ngāruawāhia
Commonwealth Games medallists in cycling
Sportspeople from Waikato
20th-century New Zealand people
Medallists at the 1958 British Empire and Commonwealth Games
Medallists at the 1962 British Empire and Commonwealth Games